Jason Shivers [SHY-verz] (born November 4, 1982, in Phoenix, Arizona) is an American football coach who is currently the defensive coordinator for the Saskatchewan Roughriders of the Canadian Football League (CFL). Shivers was a defensive back who was drafted in the fifth round of the 2004 NFL Draft by the St. Louis Rams (NFL): He also spent time with the Chicago Bears. Shivers has also played in the CFL for the Toronto Argonauts and the Hamilton Tiger-Cats.

Early years
A 2001 graduate of Phoenix's South Mountain High School. He earned First-team Super All-State 2000 defensive honors from Phoenix Metro Magazine. He was All-state, All-league and All-region at wide receiver and free safety. As a senior had 110 tackles and four interceptions. As a junior, had 15 catches for 600 yards and 10 touchdowns and on defense, he had 70 tackles, two fumble recoveries, three caused fumbles and 10 tackles for loss.

Shivers also lettered four years in track and won state individual track titles in the 100 (10.67) and 200 meter (21.57) dashes in 2001. He also was on state champion 400-meter relay team with a time of 41.82 as a junior. He earned First-team All-Arizona Republic track team honors as a senior.

College career
At Arizona State University he led the team in tackles his final three seasons, totaling 104 tackles and three interceptions in 2003 and after 121 tackles as a sophomore in 2001. Shivers posted 89 tackles as a freshman in 2000.

Professional career

Pre-draft

St. Louis Rams
Shivers was drafted in the fifth round in the 2004 NFL draft by the St. Louis Rams. He was released in the preseason.

Chicago Bears
After he was released by the Rams, Shivers was signed by the Chicago Bears and spent the 2004 season with that club.

Coaching career

Saskatchewan Roughriders 
In December 2015 Shivers joined the Saskatchewan Roughriders as the team's defensive backs coach. On February 8, 2019, the Riders announced that Shivers had been promoted to the role of defensive coordinator following the departure of Chris Jones.

Personal life
Jason Shivers has five children: Ta'Kia Shivers, born in 2000; Jason Shivers, born in 2005; Jaeda Shivers, born in 2007; Ameera Shivers, born in 2013; and Edward Shivers, born in 2016.

References

External links
CFL page
Toronto Argonauts coaches page

 Saskatchewan Roughriders Coaching Staff

1982 births
Living people
African-American players of Canadian football
American football safeties
Arizona State Sun Devils football players
Chicago Bears players
Edmonton Elks coaches
Hamilton Tiger-Cats players
Sportspeople from Phoenix, Arizona
Toronto Argonauts players
21st-century African-American sportspeople
20th-century African-American people
Players of American football from Phoenix, Arizona